Events from the year 2012 in Kuwait.

Incumbents
Emir: Sabah Al-Ahmad Al-Jaber Al-Sabah 
Prime Minister: Jaber Al-Mubarak Al-Hamad Al-Sabah

Events

 2011–12 Kuwait Emir Cup.
 Kuwaiti protests (2011–2012)

See also
Years in Jordan
Years in Syria

 
Kuwait
Kuwait
Years of the 21st century in Kuwait
2000s in Kuwait